is a passenger railway station located in the city of Matsuyama, Ehime Prefecture, Japan. It is operated by the private transportation company Iyotetsu.

Lines

Layout
The station consists of one island platform. The station building is an extension of the platform, and the structure is such that you pass through the ticket gate and cross the railroad crossing to go outside. It is the first interchange station on the Gunchū Line from the Matsuyamashi Station side, and a timetable has been set up for trains to pass each other at this station during the daytime hours.  During most of the day, trains arrive every fifteen minutes.

History
The station was opened on March 6, 1930

Surrounding area
Jimi Heisei Secondary School
Japan National Route 56

See also
 List of railway stations in Japan

References

External links

Iyotetsu Gunchū Line
Railway stations in Ehime Prefecture
Railway stations in Japan opened in 1930
Railway stations in Matsuyama, Ehime